New York's 52nd State Senate district is one of 63 districts in the New York State Senate. It has  been represented by Republican Fred Akshar since a 2015 special election to succeed fellow Republican and convicted felon Thomas Libous.

Geography
District 52 stretches along the Pennsylvania border in Broome, Chenango, Delaware, and Tioga Counties, including the city of Binghamton.

The district overlaps with New York's 19th and 23rd congressional districts, and with the 122nd, 123rd, 124th, and 126th districts of the New York State Assembly.

Recent election results

2020

2018

2016

2015 special

2014

2012

Federal results in District 52

References

52